Comparettia speciosa is an epiphytic species of orchid. It is native to Ecuador and Peru.

References

speciosa
Orchids of Ecuador
Orchids of Peru
Plants described in 1878